Gargela trilinealis is a moth in the family Crambidae. It was described by George Hampson in 1897. It is found on Fergusson Island in Papua New Guinea.

References

Crambinae
Moths described in 1897
Moths of New Guinea